The 2014 Calabrian regional election took place on 23 November 2014.

The election took place after the incumbent president, Giuseppe Scopelliti of The People of Freedom, had been forced to resign because of a conviction for abuse of power. Mario Oliverio of the Democratic Party was elected as his successor.Results

References

Elections in Calabria
2014 elections in Italy